Julie Marie Wade (born 1979) is an American writer and professor of creative writing. Wade has received numerous awards for her writing, most notably winning the Lambda Literary Award for Lesbian Memoir or Biography in 2011 for her book Wishbone.

Biography 
Wade was born in Seattle, Washington in 1979 and came out as gay in 2002 at the age of 23. She currently lives with her wife, Angie Griffin, in Hollywood, Florida.

Education 
Wade received a Bachelor of Arts in 2000 from the University of London, where she studied English and Psychology. She then attended Western Washington University, where she graduated with a Master of Arts in English, as well as a graduate certificate in Composition Studies, in 2003. In 2006, she received a Master of Fine Arts in Poetry and a graduate certificate in Women’s Studies from the University of Pittsburgh in 2006. She later studied Interdisciplinary Humanities at the University of Louisville, receiving a Doctor of Philosophy in 2012.

Career 
Aside from writing, Wade has worked at many educational institutions: Western Washington University, Arlington Elementary School in Pittsburgh, University of Pittsburgh, Carlow University, Olney Friends School, the University of Louisville, and Florida International University.

Wade currently serves as an Associate Professor of Creative Writing at Florida International University in Miami. She has received grants from the Kentucky Arts Council and the Barbara Deming Memorial Fund.

Awards 
Wade has been a finalist and winner of many writing prizes, some of which are noted in the table below.

Books

Creative nonfiction 

 Wishbone: A Memoir in Fractures (Colgate University Press, 2010; Bywater Books, 2014)
 Small Fires: Essays (Sarabande Books, 2011)
 Tremolo: An Essay (Bloom Press, 2013)
 Catechism: A Love Story (Noctuary Press, 2016)
 The Unrhymables: Collaborations in Prose, with Denise Duhamel (Noctuary Press, 2019)
 Just an Ordinary Woman Breathing (The Ohio State University, 2020)
 Telephone: Essays in Two Voices, with Brenda Miller (Cleveland State University Poetry Center, 2021)

Hybrid forms 

 P*R*I*D*E (Vermont College of Fine Arts/May Day Mountain Studios, 2020)

Poetry 

 Without: Poems (Finishing Line Press, 2010)
 Postage Due: Poems & Prose Poems (White Pine Press, 2013)
 When I Was Straight (A Midsummer Night’s Press, 2014)
 SIX (Red Hen Press, 2016)
 Same-Sexy Marriage: Poems (A Midsummer Night’s Press, 2018)
 Skirted: Poems (The Word Works, 2021)

References

External links 

 Official website

Living people
1979 births
Western Washington University alumni
University of Pittsburgh alumni
University of Louisville alumni
Florida International University faculty
Lambda Literary Award winners
21st-century American poets
21st-century American women writers
American lesbian writers
Writers from Seattle